{{Infobox writer 
| name        = Lynn Mamet
| birth_date   = 
| birth_place  = 
| occupation  = Theatre director, playwright, screenwriter, and television producer
| nationality = American
| period      = 
| genre       = 
| subject     = 
| movement    = 
| notableworks = Law & OrderThe Unit| influences  = 
| influenced  = 
| signature   = 
| website     = 
}}

Lynn Mamet (Lynn Mamet Weisberg) is an American theatre director, playwright, screenwriter, and television producer.

Biography
Mamet has written screenplays, fiction, teleplays and short stories.  She sold her first screenplay using her married name, Lynn Weisberg; the studio only learned her maiden name after purchasing it.  In 1996, the Los Angeles Times described Mamet as "one of the busiest screenwriters in Hollywood."

Her latest and most notable work is as a producer and writer for Law & Order and The Unit. In addition to her work on television, she has also written and directed her own plays, including The Walking Wounded, The Fathers, The Job, The Divorce, and The Lost Years at Playwright's Kitchen Ensemble and the Sanford Meisner Theatres.

She is the sister of David Mamet.

Selected works
PlaysThe Divorce The JobMade for TV moviesAll Lies End in MurderShort filmsOn Hope (1994) written by Mamet, directed by JoBeth Williams  Mamet won a 1994 Academy Award nomination for the play."Leslie's Folly'' (1994) written by Mamet, directed by Kathleen Turner

References

External links
 

American television producers
American women television producers
American television writers
American screenwriters
American women screenwriters
American women television writers
Living people
Place of birth missing (living people)
Year of birth missing (living people)
American women dramatists and playwrights
21st-century American women